Darantasia pardalina is a moth of the family Erebidae first described by Felder in 1875. It is found on Sulawesi and the Sula Islands in Indonesia.

References

Nudariina
Moths described in 1875